Neanisentomon is a genus of proturans in the family Eosentomidae.

Species
 Neanisentomon guicum Zhang & Yin, 1984
 Neanisentomon tienmucnicum Yin, 1990
 Neanisentomon yuenicum Zhang & Yin, 1984

References

Protura